San Juan Creek is a tributary stream of the Estrella River in San Luis Obispo County, California.

References

Rivers of San Luis Obispo County, California
La Panza Range
Rivers of Southern California